Saint Peter's Church is a Brick Gothic church in Malmö, Sweden. Built in the 14th century as the main church of the city, it has been described as "the main Gothic monument within church architecture in Skåne". The church was a spiritual centre during the Reformation, and was one of only a few churches in what was at the time medieval Denmark that suffered damage due to iconoclasm as a consequence of the Reformation. St. Peter's Church contains late medieval murals of recognized high quality, as well as a number of unusual furnishings. The altarpiece, made in 1611, is one of the largest in the Nordic countries.

History

Historical background

St. Peter's Church is the oldest church in Malmö, as well as the oldest preserved brick building, and originally the only parish church of the city. It is characteristic for the younger medieval cities of Skåne, such as Malmö, to only have one original parish church; nearby Lund, an older settlement, in contrast had a high concentration of churches early on. The explanation is probably that Malmö rose to significance at a time when the land was already subdivided into parishes following the Christianization of Scandinavia in the preceding centuries. Malmö began a rapid expansion thanks to the lucrative trade in herring around 1200 and the city was part of the economic infrastructure around the Hanseatic League and the Skåne Market. By the end of the Middle Ages the city had established itself as the most important commercial city in the province. St. Peter's Church has been described as "the main Gothic monument within church architecture in Skåne" and as a "very good and strongly authentic representative of Baltic Brick Gothic". During the 14th century, St. Peter's Church was the largest town church in Denmark. It is part of an urban structure with a still largely intact medieval street layout.

The church played an important role as a spiritual centre during the Reformation, with the Reformer  active as a priest in the church. One of only four occurrences of violence due to iconoclasm during the Danish Reformation occurred in St. Peter's Church in 1529, when Claus Mortensen led the destruction of much of the ornamentation in the church, deemed "too Catholic" by the Reformer. Of the more than sixty pre-Reformation altarpieces, only one survived more or less intact. It was also following the Reformation (in 1555) that the interior of the church was whitewashed.

Construction
Construction of the presently visible church began in the early 14th century, replacing an older Romanesque church at the same location. It was probably inaugurated in 1319 and dedicated to saints Peter and Paul, but the construction was finished only around 1380. The church is an example of Brick Gothic architecture found around the Baltic Sea, arguably most well-represented in the Marienkirche in Lübeck, which was also likely used as a direct model when building St. Peter's Church. It also displays certain influences from contemporary French Gothic architecture. The church was constructed with red bricks and was built as a Gothic basilica with a western church tower and a transept that connects to the ambulatory of the pentagonal chancel.

Later alterations
The church has been altered several times since its construction. The original church tower collapsed in 1420, prompting the construction of a new tower and new vaults supporting the ceiling in the western part of the building. Already in 1442, the tower again suffered a partial collapse and had to be rebuilt. It was rebuilt again as late as 1890, when it attained its present appearance after a renovation. Five side chapels were erected during the late 15th century and the early 16th century, of which three survive to this day. Two of them are named after the saints Anne and Mary, respectively. The third was dedicated to Saint George but is popularly called Krämarkapellet ("The chapel of the vendors") and was built for Malmö's guild of cloth dealers but used by several of the city's guilds whose coats of arms can still be seen in the chapel. The church porch was also built some time after 1420.

A substantial reconstruction of the church was made in 1847–1853 under the guidance of Carl Georg Brunius. The church was at the time in an unarguably bad condition but Brunius' renovation has nonetheless been criticized for having been harsh. The church was given an entirely new, copper roof, and large parts of the walls were replaced with new bricks. A large part of the ambulatory was entirely dismantled and rebuilt, and nearly all the buttresses of the church were heavily reconstructed. The whitewashed interior was renewed, and many of the church's Renaissance furnishings were removed; the altarpiece and organ facade were saved contrary to the wishes of Brunius, but the altarpiece was painted grey.

Between 1904 and 1910, another series of renovations were carried out. During this time, the altarpiece was restored to its earlier vibrant colours and the murals in Krämarkapellet uncovered and restored.

Smaller renovations and alterations have also been made during the 20th century. The chapel originally dedicated to Saint Anne was rebuilt in 1964. Between 1965 and 1967 the interior of the church was renovated, and the murals in Krämarkapellet carefully restored. Additional restorations of the murals were made in 1999. In the 1980s, bathrooms, a cloakroom and an information desk were installed in the church. In 2011, another major restoration of the interior of the church was carried out.

Interior

The inside of the church is characterized by the tall nave, reaching  at the transept. The walls, pillars and vaults are whitewashed, giving the interior a light and bright atmosphere. Its present state is largely that which it attained at the early 17th century.

Murals
Krämarkapellet is richly decorated with late medieval murals. Some of the paintings may have been made in the 1460s while others date from the early 1510s. They were made by an unknown master or workshop. The murals have been described as being both "iconographically sophisticated" and "technically accomplished" and in stark contrast to the naïveté typical for the many murals made in the countryside churches of the province at approximately the same time. The murals cover both the walls and the vaulted ceiling, and displays several different motifs, both secular and religious, set among a background of flowing, green vines.

Altarpiece
The altarpiece of the church is one of the largest in the Nordic countries. The altarpiece consists of four storeys or levels, one above the other. In the lowermost part there is a depiction of the Last Supper in the centre, and on each side wooden sculptures of Moses and John the Baptist, respectively. Above this there is a depiction of the Crucifixion, and above this there is a representation of the ascension. At the very top is the name of God, Yahweh, displayed.

Pulpit
The pulpit of the church was inaugurated in 1599. It displays a certain likeness to the pulpit in Lund Cathedral, inaugurated a few years earlier. It is made of black limestone and light sandstone, gilt in several places. The rich ornamentation depicts scenes from the life of Christ.

Baptismal font
The baptismal font is also made by Daniel Thomisen, and was commissioned by another city council member, Rasmus Ludvigsen. It dates from 1601 and similarly to the pulpit it is made of black limestone. The font is octagonal and six of its sides are decorated with scenes from the Bible. One of the other two sides displays the monogram of the donator and the other an inscription commemorating the donating of the font to the church.

Other furnishings
The organ is from 1951 but its facade dates from the late 18th century. Modern stained glass windows are located in the chapel of St. Anne, while the chapel of St. Mary contains a  wooden Madonna made in 1995, inspired by a medieval Madonna in the Historical Museum at Lund University. The church also contains several elaborate decorated memorials over deceased burghers of the city. The church also contains a small library, with around 40 books from 1506–1570.

Notes

References

Bibliography

External links

Official site (in Swedish)

Petri
Petri
Malmo Petri
Churches in the Diocese of Lund
Malmo Petri
14th-century establishments in Skåne County
Church frescos in Sweden
Brick Gothic